Chandrakona Jorbangla Temple is a 17th-century stone built temple at Dakshinbazar, Chandrakona in Ghatal subdivision of Paschim Medinipur district in West Bengal, India.

Geography

The temple
David J. McCutchion says, “the basic forms of Bengal hut style temples may go back to time immemorial… in construction all these char-chala and at-chala temples belong to a post-Muslim tradition.” The jor-bangla possibly developed from the ek-bangla, which along with the terracotta, was popular in the construction of mazars and darghas. Chandrakona has one of the earliest jor-bangla temples. McCutchion describes the Chandrakona Jorbangla temple as a standard jorbangla, laterite built, with extensive stucco, measuring 28’ 4” x 26’, built possibly in the 17th century.

“The Jor Bangla temple style involves two structures that resemble the traditional village huts of Bengal, one that serves as a porch in front of the other, which serves as a shrine.” It is believed to have been built by the Bhan kings and has been renovated by the West Bengal State Archaeology department.

Chandrakona Jorbangla temple is a state protected monument.

See also
 Shantinatha Shiva Temple
 Malleswara Shiva Temple
 Parvatinatha Temple

Jorbangla temple picture gallery

References

External links

Temples in West Bengal
Tourist attractions in Paschim Medinipur district